Julia or Julie Stevens may refer to:
Julie Stevens (American actress, 1916-1984), performer on Broadway and on radio ;
Julie Stevens (English actress) (born 1936), performer on children's television ;
Julie Stevens (American actress and singer), started as child performer in 1979's Annie ;
Julia Stevens, Canadian politician in 1995 New Brunswick general election#Southeastern New Brunswick.